The Washington Georges was an American basketball team based in Washington, Ohio that was a member of the Central Basketball League.

In their only season, the team dropped out of the league after going 0-30.

Year-by-year

Basketball teams in Ohio